"Bonafide Girl" is the second single from rapper Shaggy's seventh studio album, Intoxication. The song features guest vocals from Rikrok, who previously collaborated with Shaggy in 2000 for the single "It Wasn't Me", and Tony Gold. The single was released on March 11, 2007. The track samples "007 (Shanty Town)," by Desmond Dekker.

Track listing
 CD Single
 "Bonafide Girl" (featuring Rikrok)
 "Who a Wear di Jacket?"

Charts

References

2008 singles
Shaggy (musician) songs
Songs written by Desmond Dekker
2007 songs
Songs written by Shaggy (musician)
VP Records singles